Consort Hui may refer to:

China
Empress Zhenshun (died 737), concubine of Emperor Xuanzong of Tang
Madame Huarui ( 940–976), concubine of Meng Chang (emperor of Later Shu)
Empress Tudan (Digunai's wife) (died 1170), empress of the Jin dynasty
Consort Hui, two consorts (died 1670 and 1732) of the Kangxi Emperor
Imperial Noble Consort Shushen (1859–1904), concubine of the Tongzhi Emperor

Korea
Hui-bi Yun (died 1380), consort of Chunghye of Goryeo
Royal Noble Consort Huibin Jang (1659–1701), consort of Sukjong of Joseon